Robert Michael Edmans (born 25 January 1987) is a football forward who last played for Chelmsford City.

Playing career
Edmans attended Loughborough University in 2006 then played college soccer in Virginia for the Virginia Tech Hokies in America.

Upon his return to England he joining Tiptree United then Maldon Town in 2007–08. The following season he returned to Leicestershire and played for Loughborough Dynamo in the Northern Premier League. He impressed Chelmsford during a pre-season game Chelmsford City before joining Dagenham & Redbridge.

He made his FA Cup debut for Dagenham against Millwall on 17 January 2012, coming on a substitute In March 2012, Edmans joined Conference South side Dover Athletic on loan until the end of the season.

On the first of February 2013, Edmans signed on contract with Chelmsford City after having his contract terminated by Dagenham and Redbridge by mutual consent. After the arrival of Ben Strevens, it's thought that Edmans' services were no longer required by the Daggers. This is his third stint with the Clarets (his second on a permanent deal).

Career statistics

References

External links

Official Profile at the official Dagenham & Redbridge site

1987 births
Living people
Footballers from Greenwich
Association football forwards
Virginia Tech Hokies football players
Tiptree United F.C. players
Maldon & Tiptree F.C. players
Loughborough Dynamo F.C. players
Chelmsford City F.C. players
Dagenham & Redbridge F.C. players
Dover Athletic F.C. players
Macclesfield Town F.C. players
English Football League players
National League (English football) players
English footballers